Stenelmis canaliculata is a species of beetles from the Elminae subfamily which can be found throughout Western Europe.

References

Elmidae
Beetles of Europe
Beetles described in 1808
Taxa named by Leonard Gyllenhaal